Pseudostomatella is a genus of small sea snails, marine gastropod mollusks in the subfamily Stomatellinae of the family Trochidae, the top snails.

Distribution
This marine genus has a wide distribution. The species occur in the Central and East Indian Ocean, Indo-Malaysia and off Australia

Species
Species within the genus Pseudostomatella include:
 Pseudostomatella baconi (Adams, A. in Adams, H.G. & A. Adams, 1854)
 Pseudostomatella clathratula (Adams, A. in Adams, H.G. & A. Adams, 1854)
 Pseudostomatella coccinea (A. Adams, 1850)
 forma : Pseudostomatella coccinea flammulata (f) Pilsbry, H.A., 1920
 Pseudostomatella cycloradiata Usticke, 1959
 Pseudostomatella decolorata (Gould, A.A., 1848)
 Pseudostomatella erythrocoma (Dall, 1889)
 Pseudostomatella martini Poppe, Tagaro & Dekker, 2006
 Pseudostomatella orbiculata (A. Adams, 1850)
 Pseudostomatella papyracea (Gmelin, J.F., 1791)
 Pseudostomatella selecta (A. Adams, 1855)

Species brought into synonymy
 Pseudostomatella maculata (Quoy & Gaimard, 1834): synonym of Granata maculata (Quoy & Gaimard, 1834)
 Pseudostomatella rubra (Lamarck, 1822): synonym of Stomatolina rubra (Lamarck, 1822)
Taxa inquirenda
 Pseudostomatella decorata (A. Adams, 1855) 
 Pseudostomatella monilifera (A. Adams, 1850)
 Pseudostomatella splendidula (A. Adams, 1854)

References

 Vaught, K.C. (1989). A classification of the living Mollusca. American Malacologists: Melbourne, FL (USA). . XII, 195 pp.
 Higo, S., Callomon, P. & Goto, Y. (2001) Catalogue and Bibliography of the Marine Shell-Bearing Mollusca of Japan. Gastropoda Bivalvia Polyplacophora Scaphopoda Type Figures. Elle Scientific Publications, Yao, Japan, 208 pp.

External links
 Neave, Sheffield Airey. (1939-1996). Nomenclator Zoologicus vol. 1-10 Online.

 
Trochidae
Gastropod genera